Peter Bulmer (born 31 August 1965) is an English former professional footballer who played in the Football League for Chester City and Preston North End. He played at both full back and winger.

Playing career
Bulmer was the product of the youth setup with Chester City. He joined the club aged 15 and made his first-team debut as a substitute against York City on 18 December 1982. He went on to make nine league starts during the season under John Sainty, wearing the number 11 shirt. The 1983–84 season produced one more start, but in 1984–85 he was a regular in the side. This season saw him divide playing at left back and on the left wing, scoring once in his 38 league appearances. However, he was released at the end of the season and after spending time on trial with Port Vale, Bulmer dropped into non–league football with Rhyl.

He resumed his professional career when his former Chester manager John McGrath signed him for Preston North End in July 1986. He played the first four games of the 1986–87 season at full back but then suffered a knee injury which effectively finished his professional career, as he retired the following summer.

After 18 months without kicking a football, Bulmer resumed playing non–league football in North Wales. Clubs he later played for included Mold Alexandra, Flint Town United, Conwy United, Connah's Quay Nomads, Rhyl and Rhayader Town. He made 67 League of Wales appearances in the process. Away from football he has worked in personal loans.

External links
Welsh Premier League career stats

References

1965 births
Living people
Footballers from Liverpool
English footballers
Association football fullbacks
Association football wingers
Chester City F.C. players
Rhyl F.C. players
Preston North End F.C. players
Mold Alexandra F.C. players
Flint Town United F.C. players
Connah's Quay Nomads F.C. players
Conwy Borough F.C. players
Rhayader Town F.C. players
English Football League players
Cymru Premier players